The Lansing State Journal is a daily newspaper published in Lansing, Michigan, owned by Gannett.

Overview
The Lansing State Journal is the sole daily newspaper published in Greater Lansing.  The newspaper had an average Monday through Friday readership of 41,330, a Saturday readership of 43,885, and a Sunday readership of 65,904 from October 2011 to March 2012.

History

The paper was started as the Lansing Republican on April 28, 1855, to advance the causes of the newly founded Republican Party in Michigan.  Founder and publisher Henry Barnes completed only two issues of the weekly abolitionist publication before selling it and returning to Detroit.

According to the Pioneer History of Ingham County, "In a few weeks, Barnes sold his interests to Herman E. Haskill. Shortly after Haskill made this purchase he met with a great disappointment. He was not appointed State Printer. Two men, Fitch and Hosmer, got the appointment, and Haskill sold his interests to them, and they published the paper in connection with the State printing. In 1857 Fitch sold his interests to John A. Kerr, and the firm’s name was changed to Kerr & Hosmer. I can remember the two men and the old red building on West Michigan Avenue where the State printing and binding was done, and this paper was published. It had a long sign on the roof that informed the passerby that it was the State Bindery and Republican Office."

Over the next 50 years, the paper saw many name changes and many different owners, finally merging with the rival Lansing Journal forming The Lansing Journal-Republican with the January 23, 1911 edition. Three weeks later with the February 13, 1911 edition, the paper officially became The State Journal in an effort to be "unbiased and uninfluenced by the political views or aims of any party." The first Sunday edition was published on September 27, 1936.  Gannett bought the paper in 1971, and it became the Lansing State Journal on August 25, 1980. On April 15, 1985, it became a morning publication, rather than an afternoon one. In January 2016, the LSJ moved from its Lenawee Street headquarters building to the 3rd floor of the Knapp's Centre building.

Notable people
Former contributors:

 Michael Gallagherreporter

References

External links
Lansing State Journal homepage

Newspapers published in Michigan
Mass media in Lansing, Michigan
Gannett publications
1855 establishments in Michigan
Populated places established in 1855